This list explores the instances of which the city of Venice, Italy, has been mentioned or alluded to in various media.

Audio dramas referencing Venice
The BBC 7 Doctor Who audio drama adventure, The Stones of Venice (2005), is set in a future where one last great Carnival is being held before the city sinks forever

Films referencing Venice
(Chronological)
Destiny (1921), directed by Fritz Lang, starring Lil Dagover and Rudolf Klein-Rogge.
Othello (1952), directed by Orson Welles, starring Orson Welles and Suzanne Cloutier
Senso (1954), directed by Luchino Visconti, starring Alida Valli and Farley Granger
Summertime (1955), directed by David Lean, starring Katharine Hepburn. Based on The Time of the Cuckoo. Interiors shot in Pensione Accademia Villa Maravegie
Venice, the Moon and You (1959), directed by Dino Risi
From Russia with Love (1963), a James Bond film directed by Terence Young
The Avenger of Venice (1964), directed by Piero Pierotti and Carlo Campogalliani.
The Honey Pot (1967), directed by Joseph L. Mankiewicz, (based on Ben Jonson's Volpone), starring Rex Harrison, Capucine, Maggie Smith
Death in Venice (1971), directed by Luchino Visconti, base on the Thomas Mann novella
Who Saw Her Die? (1972), directed by Aldo Lado and Vittorio De Sisti.
Don't Look Now (1973), directed by Nicolas Roeg, based on story by Daphne du Maurier, starring Donald Sutherland and Julie Christie
Fellini's Casanova (1976), directed by Federico Fellini)
The Forbidden Room (1977), directed by Dino Risi.
Solamente Nero (1978), also known as The Bloodstained Shadow, directed by Antonio Bido
Damned in Venice (1978), also known as Nero veneziano, directed by Ugo Liberatore.
Who Is Killing the Great Chefs of Europe? (1978), directed by Ted Kotcheff, based upon the novel by Nan and Ivan Lyons
A Little Romance (1979), directed by George Roy Hill
Moonraker (1979), a James Bond film directed by Lewis Gilbert, (the first time principal photography for the series took place in the city)
The Great Gambler (1979), directed by Shakti Samanta, starring Amitabh Bachchan, Neetu Singh, Zeenat Aman, Prem Chopra
The Pleasure (1985), directed by Joe D'Amato, starring Andrea Guzon and Gabriele Tinti.
Vampire in Venice (1988), directed by Augusto Caminito, starring Klaus Kinski, Christopher Plummer, and Donald Pleasence
Indiana Jones and the Last Crusade (1989), directed by Steven Spielberg
Shocking Dark (1989), directed by Bruno Mattei
The Comfort of Strangers (1990), directed by Paul Schrader
Nikita (1990), also known as La Femme Nikita, directed by Luc Besson
Blame It On The Bellboy (1992), directed by Mark Herman
Only You (1994), directed by Norman Jewison
The Wings of the Dove (1997), directed by Iain Softley, based on novel by Henry James 
Everyone Says I Love You (1996), directed by Woody Allen
Dangerous Beauty (1998), directed by Marshall Herskovitz, based on The Honest Courtesan by Margaret Rosenthal
Children of the Century (1999) directed by D. Kurys, starring Juliette Binoche, Benoit Maginel, Stefano Dionisi
The Story of Us (1999), directed by Rob Reiner, starring Bruce Willis, Michelle Pfeiffer, Tim Matheson
The Talented Mr. Ripley (1999), directed by Anthony Minghella
Bread and Tulips (2000), directed by Silvio Soldini
Lara Croft: Tomb Raider (2001), directed by Simon West, based on the Tomb Raider video game series.
Senso '45 (2002), Tinto Brass directed adaptation of the Senso story, set in 1945
Just Married (2003), directed by Shawn Levy
Pokémon Heroes (2003), directed by Jim Malone and Kunihiko Yuyama 
The Italian Job (2003), directed by F. Gary Gray
The League of Extraordinary Gentlemen (2003), directed by Stephen Norrington
The Merchant of Venice (2004), directed by Michael Radford
Ocean's Twelve (2004), directed by Steven Soderbergh
Chasing Liberty (2004), directed by Andy Cadiff, starring Mandy Moore and Stark Sands 
Casanova (2005), directed by Lasse Hallström, starring Heath Ledger and Sienna Miller
Casino Royale (2006), a James Bond film directed by Martin Campbell
The Thief Lord (2006), directed by Richard Claus, starring Aaron Johnson, Rollo Weeks
Sharks In Venice (2008) is a made-for-TV action film starring Stephen Baldwin

Games referencing Venice

Board games 
Inkognito (1988) is a board game set in Venice.

Video games 
(Alphabetical by series or game title)

Assassin's Creed II  features the city during the Renaissance Era.
In the online game City of Heroes, the zone named "Founder's Falls" has an architectural resemblance to Venice.
 In the SNK game Fatal Fury 2, Andy Bogard's stage features Venice (with some inaccuracies, such as having the Leaning Tower of Pisa in the background) as you fight in a gondola down a canal. This is revisited in King of Fighters '96, where the Boss Team's Stage is set in Venice.
Gears of War features a map that resembles Venice's canals
You are able to take photographs of your tuned-up car in Gran Turismo 4 released on the PlayStation 2, in two locations in Venice, St. Marks Square, and also on a barge going under the Rialto Bridge.
The canals of Venice are featured in the arcade racing game Hydro Thunder, in the hard-level track modeled after the city.
The catacombs and the church of San Barnaba are visited in Indiana Jones and the Last Crusade: The Graphic Adventure.
The Republic Of Venice is available as an initial playable faction in the game Medieval 2: Total War
The Merchant Prince series is based on the trading and politics of Venice during the Renaissance era. The player plays one of the competing Venetian merchants trying to gain wealth and power through trades, power plays, and Machiavellian skullduggery.
Ninja Gaiden Sigma 2 feature a city canals in chapter 6
The first-person shooter Painkiller features a level called City On Water inspired by Venice.
In Sid Meier's Civilization V, Venice appears as a playable nation.
Venice is the second playable level in Sly 3: Honor Among Thieves.
The 2006 version of Sonic the Hedgehog features a city based on Venice, Italy.
A fighting arena based around Venice can be found in Soulcalibur. The fight takes place upon a stone platform isolated in Venice's water-filled streets. Typical residential Venice buildings are portrayed in the background of the level, although the fight does not take place in any of them.
Super Mario Sunshine features a city called "Delfino Plaza" which has Venice elements, after that game the "Delfino" concept has reappeared on some spin-offs like the Mario Kart series and sports series.
The city of Venezia in Tales of Phantasia is modeled after Venice.
Venice appears as a fighting arena in the first Tekken game released on the PlayStation.
Venice is a multiplayer level in Free Radical Design's TimeSplitters: Future Perfect.
Venice appears in Core Design's Tomb Raider 2.
Venice by Cryo Networks is a strategy game set in 16th century Venice
Venice is a casual game for the Windows platform, developed by Retro 64 and distributed by Reexive Arcade.
Venetica features the city during the Renaissance Era. It is the main setting for the game.
Voyage Century Online is a free nautical MMORPG developed by Snail Games and published by IGG, that features Venice as one of the Port Cities that can be used for commerce and exploration.
The La Razza Canal course from the Nintendo GameCube game, Wave Race: Blue Storm was likely modeled after Venice.
Venice appears as a map in Wolfenstein: Enemy Territory, in which the Allied agents need to steal an artifact and escape the city on a boat through its canals.
 The Sega video game House of the Dead 2 takes place in Venice.

Music referencing Venice
(Alphabetical by artist)
In 1960, French singer Charles Aznavour recorded Que C'est Triste Venise (How Sad Venice Is). Today, it is one of his most famous bilingual pieces, sung in both Italian (titled Com'è Triste Venezia) and French.
Sophie Ellis-Bextor's video for "Catch You" was shot in Venice.
Russian singer Dima Bilan's music video for the song 'На берегу неба' (Na Beregu Neba- On the shore of the sky) takes place in Venice.
Madonna's music video for her song Like a Virgin (1984), directed by Mary Lambert, was shot in Venice, Italy. It features Madonna wearing a wedding dress, dancing on a gondola.
The Italian composer Luigi Nono (1924-1990) was born and lived in Venice.
On July 15, 1989, Pink Floyd played live on a floating barge in the middle of The Grand Canal during their A Momentary Lapse of Reason tour.
Sandra's video for "Little Girl" was shot in Venice.
The video for the Siouxsie and the Banshees song Dear Prudence was shot in Venice.
Much of the music of Rondò Veneziano has centred on Venetian themes. The Rondo Veneziano (2010) DVD features three music videos set in Venice
The music video of the song Mhm Mhm by Manuel Riva, published in 2016, was shot in Venice.

Television shows and episodes referencing Venice
(Alphabetical by series)
In The Adventures of Super Mario Bros. 3, Mario and Luigi must save Venice from King Koopa.
The manga and anime series ARIA take place in the town of Neo-Venezia, based on Venice.
The fifth series Doctor Who episode, "The Vampires of Venice", takes place in the city in 1580.
Several episodes of manga and anime series Gunslinger Girl take place in Venice.
The Jem episode "In Stitches" takes place in this city.
In the manga and anime One Piece, the island of Water 7 is based on Venice.
An episode of The Scooby-Doo Show was set in Venice.
In the 38th episode of the Tatsunoko anime Yatterman, made in 2008, the Yatterman and the Doronbo Team battle in Venice.  The ring that was found on the Campanile de San Marco was taken by the Doronbo Team and it was a fake ring.

Written works referencing Venice

Fiction (drama and literature)
(Alphabetical by author's surname)
O Colar, a play by Portuguese author Sophia de Mello Breyner Andresen
A Beautiful Crime (2020) – Christopher Bollen
Watermark - Joseph Brodsky
Relief - L.E. 
Invisible Cities - Italo Calvino
Jonathan Strange and Mr. Norrell (2004) - Susanna Clarke
The Haunted Hotel (1878) - Wilkie Collins
Lionboy - Zizou Corder
Little Dorrit - Charles Dickens
Don't Look Now - Daphne du Maurier
In the Company of the Courtesan (2006) - Sarah Dunant
House of Niccolo series - Dorothy Dunnett
1634: The Galileo Affair - Eric Flint and Andrew Dennis
The Thief Lord (2002) - Cornelia Funke
The Silent Gondoliers - William Goldman under the name of S. Morgenstern
Servant of Two Masters - Carlo Goldoni
Across the River and Into the Trees - Ernest Hemingway
The Talented Mr. Ripley (1955) - Patricia Highsmith
Those Who Walk Away (1967) - Patricia Highsmith
Stravaganza: City of Masks - Mary Hoffman
Scorpia - Anthony Horowitz
The Aspern Papers (1888) - Henry James
The Wings of the Dove - Henry James
Shylock's Daughter (1997) - Erica Jong
Volpone (1606 / 1607) - Ben Jonson
The Shadow of the Lion - Mercedes Lackey, Eric Flint and Dave Freer
The Thief of Venice - Jane Langton
The Time of the Cuckoo (1951) - Arthur Laurents
Guido Brunetti crime series - Donna Leon
The Bravo of Venice - M.G. Lewis
Carnevale - Michelle Lovric
The Floating Book - Michelle Lovric
The Mourning Emporium - Michelle Lovric
The Remedy - Michelle Lovric
The Undrowned Child - Michelle Lovric
Der Tod in Venedig (Death in Venice) (1912) - Thomas Mann
The Comfort of Strangers - Ian McEwan
The Water Mirror (2005) - Kai Meyer
The Venice Adriana - Ethan Mordden
Daughter of Venice - Donna Jo Napoli
The Rossetti Letter (2007) - Christi Phillips
The Assignation - Edgar Allan Poe 
The Family - Mario Puzo
Vivaldi's Virgins (2007) - Barbara Quick
Cry to Heaven  - Anne Rice
The Vampire Armand - Anne Rice
Venise en hiver (Venice in the Winter) - Emmanuel Roblès
The Desire and Pursuit of the Whole - Frederick Rolfe
Der Geisterseher (The Ghost-Seer) - Friedrich Schiller
An Equal Music - Vikram Seth
The Merchant of Venice (1594–97) - William Shakespeare
Othello (1603–04) - William Shakespeare
Mystery of Venice series - Edward Sklepowich, an American Expatriate university lecturer teaching at Sousse Faculty of Arts and Humanities.
Watteau in Venice (1994) - Philippe Sollers
Territorial Rights - Muriel Spark
Miss Garnet's Angel - Salley Vickers
Candide - Voltaire
Brideshead Revisited - Evelyn Waugh
The Passion (1987) - Jeanette Winterson

Non-fiction
(Alphabetical by author's surname)
John Berendt - The City of Falling Angels
Casanova - History of My Life
E.V. Lucas,  A Wanderer in Venice
Francesco da Mosto - Francesco's Venice
Francesco da Mosto -  Francesco's Italy
Jane Turner Rylands - Venetian Stories 
Jane Turner Rylands - Across the Bridge of Sighs: More Venetian Stories
John Ruskin - The Stones of Venice

Poetry
(Alphabetical by author's surname)
T. S. Eliot - "Burbank with a Baedeker: Bleistein with a Cigar" (1920)

References

External links
 Venice in films

Media, Venice in
Media
Lists of mass media in Italy
Italy in popular culture